Johnny Brandon (16 July 1925 – 26 July 2017) was an English singer and songwriter, popular during the 1950s, who recorded for a number of labels. His perennial backing group was known as The Phantoms. His early hits included "Tomorrow" and "Don't Worry". He also recorded versions  of "Slow Poke" (re-titled as "Slow Coach") and "Painting the Clouds with Sunshine".

Brandon later composed several Off-Broadway musicals, including Cindy (1964) and Billy Noname (1970). In 1979, he was jointly nominated for a Tony Award for Best Original Score for his work on Eubie!. Brandon is also known for his involvement in the musicals Ain't Doin' Nothin' But Singin' My Song (1982) and Oh, Diahne! (1997).

He released his first solo album, Then and Now, in 2005 (albeit as a compilation of his old recordings combined with several that were new). Brandon died in July 2017 at the age of 92.

Chart single discography
"Tomorrow" (1955) (Polygon) - UK number 8 †
"Don't Worry" (1955) (Polygon) - UK number 18 ‡

† Credited as Johnny Brandon with The Phantoms and The Norman Warren Music
‡ Credited as Johnny Brandon with The Phantoms

Selected filmography
 Fun at St. Fanny's (1956)

See also
Polygon Records discography
List of gay, lesbian or bisexual people: Bi-Bz

References

External links

The Villager article
Film reference website

1925 births
2017 deaths
British rock and roll musicians
English male singers
English pop singers
English LGBT musicians